The St Lawrence and Mary Magdalene Drinking Fountain is a drinking fountain on the eastern side of Carter Lane Gardens near St Paul's Cathedral in London, United Kingdom.

Design
The fountain was designed by architect John Robinson. It features bronze sculpture by artist Joseph Durham. Statuary on it depicts St Lawrence and St Mary Magdalene.

History
The fountain was originally installed in 1866 outside the Church of St Lawrence Jewry. It was dismantled into 150 pieces in the 1970s and put into a city vault for fifteen years, then stored in a barn at a farm in Epping. The pieces were sent to a foundry in Chichester for reassembly in 2009. It was moved to the current location in 2010.

References

External links

 

1866 establishments in the United Kingdom
1866 sculptures
Bronze sculptures in the United Kingdom
Drinking fountains in the United Kingdom
Grade II listed buildings in the City of London
Mary Magdalene
Monuments and memorials in London
Outdoor sculptures in London
Statues in London